Muhammad Tayyib Qasmi (known as Qari Muhammad Tayyib) was an Indian Sunni Islamic scholar  who served as Vice Chancellor of Darul Uloom Deoband for more than half a century.  He was grandson of Muhammad Qasim Nanautavi, the founder of the Darul Uloom Deoband.

Biography
Muhammad Tayyib Qasmi was born in 1892 or 1897 into the Siddiqi family of Nanauta. He served as the vice-chancellor of Darul Uloom Deoband from 1928 to 1980. He also founded the All India Muslim Personal Law Board and headed it until his death.

He wrote devotional poetry in Urdu to Muhammed,  entitled Nabi e Akram Shafi e Azam. His poetical compositions have been published as Irfan-e-Arif.

He died in Deoband on 17 July 1983. His funeral prayer was led by his eldest son Muhammad Salim Qasmi.

Literary works
Muhammad Tayyib’s books include:
Al-Tashabbuh fil-Islam
Mashaheer-e-Ummat
Kalimat-e-Tayyibat
Atyab al-Thamar fi Mas'alat al-Qaza wal-QadrScience aur IslamTalimat-e-Islam aur Maseehi AqwaamMas'alah Zuban-e-Urdu Hindustan MeinDin-o-SiyasatAsbab Urooj-o-Zawaley AqwaamIslami Azadi Ka Mukammal ProgramAl-Ijtehad wal TaqleedUsool Dawat-e-IslamIslami MasawatFitri HukumatTranslations of his booksHuman Being: A Distinguished Creature 
The Maslak of Ulama of DeobandIslam and Sectarianism''

See also
List of Darul Uloom Deoband alumni

Notes

References

Source
 
 
 
aldebal

Deobandis
Hanafis
Maturidis
1897 births
1983 deaths
People from Deoband
Darul Uloom Deoband alumni
Academic staff of Darul Uloom Deoband
Qasmi family
Students of Mahmud Hasan Deobandi
Students of Anwar Shah Kashmiri
Vice-Chancellors of Darul Uloom Deoband
Disciples of Ashraf Ali Thanwi